The 17th Army Corps was an Army corps in the Imperial Russian Army.

Composition
3rd Infantry Division
35th Infantry Division

Part of
5th Army: 1914
4th Army: 1914
9th Army: 1914 - 1915
8th Army: 1915 - 1916
11th Army: 1916 - 1917
5th Army: 1917

Commanders 

 08.11.1888 — 28.11.1892 — Lieutenant General Nikolai Zalesov
 20.12.1892 — 14.07.1899 — Lieutenant General Stepan Stepanovič Leonov
 14.07.1899 — 04.11.1905 — Lieutenant General Alexander Bilderling
 12.02.1906 — 20.04.1906 — Lieutenant General Vladimir Volkov
 24.04.1906 — 03.04.1909 — Lieutenant General Vladimir Glazov
 15.04.1909 — 02.04.1917 — Lieutenant General Petr Yakovlev
 02.04.1917 — 28.07.1917 — Lieutenant General Fyodor Ogorodnikov
 28.07.1917 — хх.02.1918 — General-Major Nikolai Shilling

References 
 

Corps of the Russian Empire